The 1948 Vermont Catamounts football team was an American football team that represented  the University of Vermont in the Yankee Conference during the 1948 college football season. In their sixth year under head coach John C. Evans, the team compiled a 4–3–1 record.

Schedule

References

Vermont
Vermont Catamounts football seasons
Vermont Catamounts football